Instant Pleasure may refer to:

 Instant gratification
 Instant Pleasure (album), a 2000 album by Rockell
 "Instant Pleasure" (song), a 2004 song by Seth Swirsky
 Instant Pleasures, an album by Shed Seven